Jairo Joseth Jiménez Robles (born 7 January 1993) is a Panamanian international footballer who plays for UD Universitario.

Club career
He started his career at Chorrillo before moving abroad to join Spanish side Elche's B-squad.

International career
Jiménez played at the 2011 FIFA U-20 World Cup in Colombia.

He made his senior debut for Panama in June 2013 friendly match against Peru and has, as of 10 June 2015, earned a total of 12 caps, scoring 1 goal. He represented his country in 4 FIFA World Cup qualification matches and played at the 2013 CONCACAF Gold Cup.

International goals
Scores and results list Panama's goal tally first.

References

External links
 
 
 

1993 births
Living people
Sportspeople from Panama City
Association football midfielders
Panamanian footballers
Panama international footballers
2013 CONCACAF Gold Cup players
Unión Deportivo Universitario players
Elche CF Ilicitano footballers
Segunda División B players
Panamanian expatriate footballers
Panamanian expatriate sportspeople in Spain
Expatriate footballers in Spain
Footballers at the 2015 Pan American Games
Pan American Games competitors for Panama
Panama under-20 international footballers
Panama youth international footballers